Polymerus basalis, the red-spotted aster mirid, is a species of plant bug in the family Miridae. It is found in Central America and North America.

Subspecies
These two subspecies belong to the species Polymerus basalis:
 Polymerus basalis basalis (Reuter, 1897)
 Polymerus basalis fuscatus Knight, 1926

References

Further reading

External links

 

Articles created by Qbugbot
Insects described in 1876
Polymerus